NXT TakeOver: Orlando was the 14th NXT TakeOver professional wrestling livestreaming event produced by WWE. It was held exclusively for wrestlers from the promotion's NXT brand division. The event aired exclusively on the WWE Network and took place on April 1, 2017, at the Amway Center in Orlando, Florida as part of the WrestleMania 33 weekend festivities.

Five matches were contested at the event. In the main event, Bobby Roode defeated Shinsuke Nakamura to retain the NXT Championship. On the undercard, Asuka retained the NXT Women's Championship against Ember Moon and Authors of Pain (Akam and Rezar) retained the NXT Tag Team Championship against #DIY (Johnny Gargano and Tommaso Ciampa) and The Revival (Scott Dawson and Dash Wilder). All of the championships were given new belt designs. This was also the final NXT event for Shinsuke Nakamura, Tye Dillinger, and The Revival (Scott Dawson and Dash Wilder), who were called up to the main roster. This event is also notable for the debut of Aleister Black and the return of Drew Galloway (now under the name Drew McIntyre he previously used in WWE), who was sitting in the front rows, until ESPN confirmed that Galloway had re-signed with WWE and perform under the NXT brand.

Production

Background
TakeOver was a series of professional wrestling shows that began in May 2014, as WWE's then-developmental league NXT held their second WWE Network-exclusive event, billed as TakeOver. In subsequent months, the "TakeOver" moniker became the brand used by WWE for all of their NXT live specials. TakeOver: Orlando was scheduled as the 14th NXT TakeOver event and was held on April 1, 2017, as a support show for WrestleMania 33. It was held at the Amway Center and was named after the venue's city of Orlando, Florida.

Storylines

The card comprised five matches. The matches resulted from scripted storylines, where wrestlers portrayed heroes, villains, or less distinguishable characters that built tension and culminated in a wrestling match or series of matches. Results were predetermined by WWE's writers on the NXT brand, while storylines were produced on their weekly television program, NXT.

Event

Preliminary matches 
The event opened with Sanity (Eric Young, Alexander Wolfe, Killian Dain, and Nikki Cross) facing Tye Dillinger, Ruby Riott, Roderick Strong, and Kassius Ohno (who was a replacement for No Way Jose) in an eight-person mixed tag team match. Dain performed an "Ulster Plantation" on Dillinger to win the match.

Next, Aleister Black faced Andrade Cien Almas. Black performed "Black Mass" on Almas for the win.

After that, The Authors of Pain (Akam and Rezar) (accompanied by Paul Ellering) defended the NXT Tag Team Championship against DIY (Johnny Gargano and Tommaso Ciampa) and The Revival (Scott Dawson and Dash Wilder) in a triple threat elimination match. Akam and Rezar performed "The Last Chapter" on Ciampa to eliminate DIY. Akam and Rezar performed the "Super Collider" on Wilder and Dawson to retain the title.

In the penultimate match, Asuka defended the NXT Women's Championship against Ember Moon. In the end, Ember attempted the "Eclipse" on Asuka but Asuka pushed the referee into the ring ropes, causing Moon to fall. Asuka performed a roundhouse kick on Moon to retain the title.

Main event 
In the main event, Bobby Roode defended the NXT Championship against Shinsuke Nakamura. During the match, Roode targeted Nakamura's leg. Roode performed a "Glorious DDT" on Nakamura for a near-fall. Roode then retrieved the ring bell but the referee prevented Roode from using it, allowing Nakamura to perform an inverted exploder suplex on Roode. Nakamura attempted a "Kinshasa" but Roode countered into a spinebuster on Nakamura for a near-fall. Roode performed a rotating "Glorious DDT" on Nakamura to retain the title.

Results

1 Kassius Ohno replaced No Way Jose, who was unable to compete after an attack by SAnitY.

Tag Team elimination match

References

External links 
 

Orlando
Professional wrestling in Orlando, Florida
2017 WWE Network events
2017 in sports in Florida
Events in Orlando, Florida
April 2017 events in the United States